E. Trenton Brown III is a Judge of the Georgia Court of Appeals.

Education

Brown received a B.A. degree in Economics from the University of Georgia at Athens in 1995 and a J.D. degree from the Mercer University Walter F. George School of Law in 1999.

Legal career

After his graduation from law school, he served as sole practitioner at Trenton Brown III, PC in Eatonton, Georgia.

State court service

Brown was appointed judge of the State Court of Putnam County by Governor Sonny Perdue in 2008, then appointed judge of Superior Court in the Ocmulgee Judicial Circuit in 2012 by Governor Nathan Deal. He successfully ran unopposed in 2014 and again in 2018.

Appointment to Georgia Court of Appeals

On May 10, 2018, Governor Deal appointed Brown to the Court of Appeals of Georgia to fill the vacancy left by Tripp Self III, who had been appointed to a federal judgeship. Brown was sworn into office on June 5, 2018.

Personal life

Brown lives in Putnam County, Georgia with his wife, Jill, a teacher, and their two children.

References

External links
Official Biography on Georgia Judicial Branch website 

Living people
Georgia (U.S. state) lawyers
Georgia (U.S. state) state court judges
Georgia Court of Appeals judges
Mercer University alumni
University of Georgia alumni
21st-century American judges
20th-century American lawyers
Year of birth missing (living people)